There's No Smoke Without Fire is a 1973 French-Italian thriller film directed by André Cayatte. It was entered into the 23rd Berlin International Film Festival where it won the Silver Bear Special Jury Prize.

Plot 
In the Paris suburb of Chavigny, Joseph Boussard (André Falcon) holds political office in the lead up to an election. When a campaigner for the opposition is killed, the respected Dr. Peyrac (Bernard Fresson) decides to contest the election. One of Boussard's aides obtains and circulates a doctored photograph of Peyrac's wife, Sylvie (Annie Girardot), engaged in group sex at the home of their friends, the Leroys. Peyrac calls for the authenticity of the photograph to be validated but is shut down.

The photographer who produced the fake is murdered; Peyrac is accused for the crime and imprisoned. Sylvie defends her husband with the assistance of Olga Leroy (Mireille Darc). Olga knows people in high places who could be affected by the scandal. Peyrac is released but the scandal has negatively impacted on his standing with his friends and his support of the community.

Cast
 Annie Girardot as Sylvie Peyrac
 Mireille Darc as Olga Leroy
 Bernard Fresson as Dr. Peyrac
 Michel Bouquet as Morlaix
 André Falcon as Boussard
 Paul Amiot as Georges Arnaud
 Micheline Boudet as Corinne
 Pascale de Boysson as Véronique
 Marc Michel as Jean-Paul Leroy
 Georges Riquier as The Judge
 Frédéric Simon as Peyrac's Son
 Mathieu Carrière as Ulrich Berl
 Marthe Villalonga
 Nathalie Courval
 André Reybaz
 Pierre Tabard

References

External links

1973 films
1970s political thriller films
French political thriller films
Italian political thriller films
1970s French-language films
Films directed by André Cayatte
Silver Bear Grand Jury Prize winners
1970s French films
1970s Italian films